Citizen Toxie: The Toxic Avenger IV is a 2000 American superhero splatter comedy film directed by Lloyd Kaufman and written by Trent Haaga. It is the fourth installment of The Toxic Avenger franchise. Despite being the third sequel to The Toxic Avenger, Stan Lee's opening narration claims that Citizen Toxie is, in fact, the official sequel to the first film, disacknowledging the events of the first two sequels.

Plot

When the notorious Diaper Mafia take hostage the Tromaville School for the Very Special, only the Toxic Avenger and his morbidly obese sidekick Lardass can save Tromaville. However, an explosion results in some unforeseeable consequences where it creates a dimensional tear between Tromaville and its dimensional mirror image Amortville. While the Toxic Avenger (Toxie) is trapped in Amortville, Tromaville comes under the control of the superhuman powered hero's evil doppelgänger the Noxious Offender (Noxie). With the citizens of Tromaville unaware of the switch, Mayor Goldberg decides to combat "Toxie" by calling in every superhero he can afford. Meanwhile, Toxie's wife Sarah becomes pregnant with two babies from two different fathers. It is up to Toxie to return to Tromaville to stop Noxie's rampage and come to his wife's aid.

Cast
 David Mattey as The Toxic Avenger / Melvin Ferd, a janitor that got mutated into a deformed superhero.
 David Mattey also performs The Noxious Offender, an evil version of The Toxic Avenger from an alternate reality.
 David Mattey also portrays a customer of Chester's.
 Clyde Lewis as The Voice of The Toxic Avenger and The Noxious Offender
 Mark Torgl as Melvin "Evil Melvin" and Melvin Ferd III
 Heidi Sjursen as Sarah / Claire, the blind girlfriend of The Toxic Avenger.
 Joe Fleishaker as Chester / Lardass, the obese sidekick of The Toxic Avenger.
 Paul Kyrmse as Sgt. Kabukiman, a superhero who has become a pathetic has-been.
 Paul Kyrmse also portrays Evil Kabukiman, a more-threatening version of Sgt. Kabukiman from an alternate reality.
 Ron Jeremy as Mayor Goldberg, the Mayor of Tromaville.
 Dan Snow as Sergeant Kazinski
 Michael Budinger as Tito
 Lisa Terezakis as "Sweetie Honey"
 Barry Brisco as Pompey
 Trent Haaga as Tex Diaper, a member of the Diaper Mafia.
 Caleb Emerson as Rex Diaper, a member of the Diaper Mafia.
 Yaniv Sharon as Lex Diaper, a member of the Diaper Mafia.
 Stan Lee as The Narrator
 James Gunn as Dr. Flem Hocking
 Hank the Angry Drunken Dwarf as God
 Corey Feldman as "Kinky" Finkelstein, Sarah's gynecologist.
 Debbie Rochon as Ms. Weiner
 Jason Sklar as Jason Diaz
 Randy Sklar as Jason Gonzales
 Al Goldstein as Mayor Goldberg's Press Secretary
 Tom Fulp as New Wave Painter, the creator of Newgrounds
 Kevin Eastman as a Biker who gets killed by Noxie
 Julie Strain as a Tromadu model who gets killed by Noxie
 Lemmy as Lemmy
 Lemmy also portrays the alternate reality Lemmy
 Eli Roth as Frightened Tromaville Citizen
 Bill Weeden as Abortion Doctor
 Will Keenan as man Getting Hit By Car On The News
 Mitch Collins as Racist Truck Driver, The Original Toxic Avenger
 Rick Collins as Police Chief, the unnamed chief of police. Collins is the only actor except for Dan Snow that has appeared in all 4 Toxic Avenger movies.
 Gil Brenton as Warren. Brenton reprises his role from Class of Nuke 'Em High (1986)
 Charlotte Haug as Mrs. Ferd, Toxie's mom.
 Tromelissa Saytar as Lesbian Art Student
 Bella Compagna as Diaper Mafia Temptress
 Terri Firmer as Wet Lesbian
 Terri Firmer also portrays a Topless Deaf Translator
 Stacy Burke as Additional Contest Winner
 Tiffany Shepis as Beautiful Interpretative Dancer
 Celeste Octavia as Glamorous Gyno-American
 Celeste Octavia also portrays a Naked Nurse
 Devin DeVasquez as Glamorous Gyno-American
 Masuimi Max as Glamorous Gyno-American
 Lenore Claire as herself (uncredited)
 Hugh Hefner as The President of The United States (uncredited)

Director Lloyd Kaufman also shows up in the end of the film during a PSA about traveling accidentally to other dimensions.

Release

Home media
The film was released on DVD on March 18, 2003. The DVD includes deleted scenes; three commentary tracks from the director, actors and crew; “around the world” footage; and a more than two-hour documentary dubbed as a real look at filmmaking.

Reception

Critical response
Unlike The Toxic Avenger'''s first two sequels, The Toxic Avenger Part II and The Toxic Avenger Part III: The Last Temptation of Toxie, which both received negative reviews, Citizen Toxie: The Toxic Avenger IV received positive reviews and currently has a 70% "fresh" rating on Rotten Tomatoes. Stephen Holden of The New York Times opined, "If the take-no-prisoners humor of Citizen Toxie is very funny, the movie's relentless comic excess is ultimately a little exhausting."

Sequel
Shortly after the release of the fourth entry, director Lloyd Kaufman announced a fifth entry titled Toxic Twins: The Toxic Avenger V. As showcased in Citizen Toxie'''s ending, Toxie's wife Sarah was pregnant with twins and the film will revolve around them. In 2010 a press release announced that Collyn McCoy would serve as the screenwriter.  Kaufman shot promo footage for the film in 2013 and 2016, but currently Troma has not begun official production on the sequel.

References

External links
 
 
 
 

The Toxic Avenger (franchise)
2000 films
2000 black comedy films
2000 comedy horror films
2000 LGBT-related films
2000s science fiction comedy films
American black comedy films
American science fiction comedy films
American LGBT-related films
American satirical films
American science fiction horror films
Films directed by Lloyd Kaufman
Fiction about God

Films set in New Jersey
Films shot in New York (state)
American independent films
Lesbian-related films
Films about mental health
American sequel films
American slapstick comedy films
American splatter films
American superhero films
LGBT-related superhero films
Superhero horror films
Troma Entertainment films
2000s English-language films
2000s American films